Utricularia geminiscapa, the hiddenfruit bladderwort, is a perennial, medium-sized species of aquatic bladderwort. This species occurs naturally in the northeastern United States and Canada with one record from British Columbia in Western Canada. A small population is present near Westport in New Zealand where the species is thought to have recently naturalized- it was first recorded in this area in 1975.

See also
List of Utricularia species

References

Carnivorous plants of North America
Carnivorous plants of New Zealand
geminiscapa